Old Princes Highway is a collection of roads, described as any part of an earlier route designated as Princes Highway, located in Victoria, Australia. Sections of the road run through Geelong, Werribee, and through the outer fringes of south-eastern Melbourne eventually to Morwell East. In the time since their de-listing as Princes Highway, many former sections have since been renamed, or have devolved to their original names.

Route

West
Princes Highway (West) runs from the interstate border with South Australia through western Victoria all the way to the western suburbs of Melbourne, with some towns along this route later bypassed. Old Princes Highway, consisting of former sections of Princes Highway, include: through greater Geelong (from Waurn Ponds to Corio), bypassed by Geelong Ring Road and now allocated route A10; and through Werribee (from Cocoroc to Hoppers Crossing), bypassed by Maltby Bypass and now allocated route C109. One last section runs through western suburban Melbourne, from the interchange with West Gate Freeway and Western Ring Road in Laverton North to Flemington, signposted as both Princes Highway and Geelong Road, but this is still officially gazetted as Princes Highway (West), and the former alignment through central Melbourne was eventually re-declared as their own separate constituent parts.

East
Princes Highway (East) runs from central Melbourne through eastern Victoria all the way to the interstate border with New South Wales, with many of the towns along this route, particularly through Gippsland, later bypassed by sections of Princes Freeway. This first section runs through south-eastern suburban Melbourne, from the intersection with King and Flinders Streets in the Melbourne CBD to the interchange with Monash and Princes Freeways in Narre Warren, signposted as both Princes Highway and Dandenong Road, but is still officially gazetted as Princes Highway (East). Old Princes Highway includes: from Berwick through Beaconsfield and Pakenham to Nar Nar Goon and now allocated route C101; through Drouin and Warragul and more commonly known as Princes Way, now allocated route C102; through Moe and Newborough (along what is now Lloyd Street and Narracan Drive) as route C103, then descending into the La Trobe Valley through the Haunted Hills, along what is now Haunted Hills Road, passed almost due west through what is now the Yallourn Open Cut Mine to join today's Morwell Bridge Road at the Morwell River, and from there, through Morwell along what is now Princes Drive and now allocated route C104.

The first improvements to the route came in the late 1950s when the expansion of the Yallourn open cut necessitated the relocation of the highway. The CRB took this opportunity to provide a high standard access-controlled alignment as well as a bypass of Moe. The first section of the new highway opened in 1959/60 as a single carriageway super-2 expressway between Hernes Oak and the Morwell River. Following in December 1964 was a westerly extension of the super-2 highway from Hernes Oak to Gunns Gully (Newborough) and the Moe Bypass completed the new route - opening in early 1967. The section between Gunns Gully and Hernes Oak inherited the "Haunted Hills" nickname that applied to the original highway between Newborough and Hernes Oak. Duplication of the Moe-Morwell section was commenced after the opening of the Moe Bypass and completed west to Gunns Gully in 1971 and to the western side of Moe in 1979.

It is anticipated that with the future completion of the Traralgon bypass that a new section of the highway will become superseded from the original Highway 1.

History

As a named route, the highway came into being when pre-existing roads were renamed Prince's Highway after the planned visit to Australia by the Prince of Wales (later to become king Edward VIII and, after abdicating, the Duke of Windsor) in 1920. The original submissions in January 1920 were in order for the Prince to have the opportunity during his visit to make the trip from Melbourne to Sydney overland along the route. That idea never came to fruition, but the prince did give his permission for the naming. The Victorian section of the highway had an opening ceremony when the first section of road from Melbourne was opened on 10 August 1920 in Warragul.

Approval was later given by the Victorian executive in January 1922 to extend the highway west from Melbourne through Geelong, Camperdown, Warrnambool and Portland to the South Australian border. The passing of the Highways and Vehicles Act of 1924 through the Parliament of Victoria provided for the declaration of State Highways, roads two-thirds financed by the State government through the Country Roads Board (later VicRoads). Prince's Highway was declared a State Highway on 1 July 1925, traversing the whole length of the State from its western boundary near Mount Gambier in South Australia, through Port Fairy, Warrnambool, Geelong to Melbourne, through Dandenong, Warragul, Sale, Bairnsdale and Orbost to the eastern boundary of the state towards Eden in New South Wales (for a total of 540 miles).

The passing of the Road Management Act 2004 through the Parliament of Victoria granted the responsibility of overall management and development of Victoria's major arterial roads to VicRoads: VicRoads re-declared the road in 2010 as Princes Highway West (Arterial #6500), beginning at the state border with South Australia to Geelong, then from Altona North to Parkville; and in 2008 as Princes Highway East (Arterial #6510), beginning at the Melbourne CBD to Narre Warren, then through Yarragon, Trafalgar and Morwell, the from Morwell to the state border with New South Wales.

Portions of both the western and eastern section of Princes Highway have further devolved with their own classification and names: the section through Geelong (from Waurn Ponds to Corio) was re-declared in 2012 as Corio-Waurn Ponds Road (Arterial #6800) (following the opening of Geelong Ring Road); the section through Werribee (from Cocoroc to Hoppers Crossing) was re-declared in 2004 as Werribee Main Road (Arterial #5445); the section through outer south-eastern Melbourne (from Berwick to Nar Nar Goon) was re-declared in 2004 as Berwick-Beaconsfield Road (Arterial #5163) and in 2007 as Beaconsfield-Nar Nar Goon Road (Arterial #6460); the section through Drouin and Warragul (signposted as Princes Way) was re-declared in 2004 as Drouin-Warragul Road (Arterial #5594); the section through Moe (signposted as Lloyd Street and Narracan Drive) was re-declared in 2004 as part of Moe-Glengarry Road (Arterial #5539); and the section through Norwell (signposted as Princes Drive) was re-declared in 2004 as part of Morwell-Traralgon Road (Arterial #5921).

The former alignment of Princes Highway through central Melbourne from Parkville to the southern border of the CBD - along Flemington Road (Arterial #5044), Harker Street (Arterial #5026), Curzon Street (Arterial #5027), and King Street (Arterial #5041), - devolved back to their own identities in 2004, no longer part of Princes Highway but not referenced as Old Princes Highway.

Former route numbers
Old Princes Highway has many former route allocations including former National Route 1; its routing through Melbourne and along present sections of Princes Highway have been included for sake of completion. Where and when the former route numbers were implemented are stated below.

through Waurn Ponds:
 National Route 1 
 A1 
unallocated: 
Waurn Ponds – Corio:
 National Route 1 
 M1 
 A10 
Cocoroc – Hoppers Crossing:
 National Route 1 
unallocated: 
 C109 
Brooklyn – North Melbourne:
 National Route 1 
 Alt National Route 1 
 Metro Route 83 
North Melbourne – Parkville:
 National Route 1 
 Alt National Route 1 
 National Route 79 
 Metro Route 60 
Parkville – Hallam:
 National Route 1 
 Alt National Route 1 
Hallam – Narre Warren:
 National Route 1 
 M1 
 Alt National Route 1 
Berwick – Beaconsfield:
 National Route 1 
unallocated: 
 C101 
Beaconsfield – Nar Nar Goon:
 National Route 1 
 M1 
 C101 
Drouin – Nilma:
 National Route 1 
unallocated: 
 C102 
Moe – Newborough:
 National Route 1 
unallocated: 
 C103 
Morwell – East Morwell:
 National Route 1 
unallocated: 
 C104

Major intersections

Waurn Ponds–Corio

Cocoroc–Hoppers Crossing

Berwick–Nar Nar Goon

Drouin–Nilma

Moe–Newborough

Morwell

Gallery

See also

 Highways in Victoria

References

Highways in Victoria (Australia)
Transport in the City of Wyndham
Transport in the City of Hobsons Bay
Transport in the City of Maribyrnong
Transport in the City of Brimbank
Transport in the City of Melbourne (LGA)
Transport in the City of Port Phillip
Transport in Geelong
Transport in the City of Stonnington
Transport in the City of Glen Eira
Transport in the City of Monash
Transport in the City of Casey
Transport in the Shire of Cardinia
Shire of Baw Baw
City of Latrobe
Transport in Barwon South West (region)